Mount Umm Al-Daraj is a mountain located in the northern part of Jordan, on the borders between Jerash Governorate and Ajloun Governorate.

Geography  
It is located to the northwest of Jerash and east of Ajloun, between the towns: Souf, Anjara, and Sakib.

Ecology 
Several types of trees lives in the mountain, that includes Oak, Maple, Cypress, Carob, and Wild Pistachio. Among the plants growing, there are several species such as Black Iris and Wild Daffodil.

References 

Umm Daraj